The Raven is a stylized silent 1915 American biographical film of Edgar Allan Poe starring Henry B. Walthall as Poe. The film was written and directed by Charles Brabin from a 1904 play and 1909 novel by George C. Hazelton.

Plot

The film begins by tracing Poe's ancestral heritage before Poe himself is born. After the loss of his parents, Poe is taken in by the John and Francis Allan in Richmond, Virginia. The film then jumps ahead about 15 years to Poe's time at the University of Virginia. Due to debts from playing cards and a growing interest in wine, Poe begins to have difficulties. He hallucinates that he has killed a man in a pistol duel.

Poe meets Virginia and they spend a day together, riding a horse and sitting "beside the glassy pool of romance." He tells her a fairy tale, a raven perching on Poe's shoulder as he finishes the story, before they go on a walk together. Upon seeing a black slave (listed in the credits only as "Negro") being whipped, he buys the slave with an IOU for $600.00. The slave's former owner then goes to John Allan to collect the debt. Allan calls Poe a "scoundrel" for causing so many bills.

After having a drink with his "chum" Tony, Poe goes to visit Virginia. Tony follows shortly after and the two compete for Virginia's affection. Later, Virginia says she will choose the man who guesses which hand holds a wreath behind her back. Poe allows Tony to go first and, though he guesses correctly, Virginia secretly switches the wreath to the other hand so that Poe can win. Shortly after, in front of Tony and Virginia, Allan questions Poe's spending habits. Allan causes quite a scene, despite his wife's attempts to calm him. Poe is asked to leave the Allan family but Virginia offers to come along. Poe's recently purchased slave comes along as well.

Poe, in Fordham, New York, is in "dire poverty" along with Virginia and her mother Maria. Virginia has a terrible coughing fit, a sign of her tuberculosis. Poe, desperate for money, unsuccessfully attempts to sell some of his work to George Rex Graham. Virginia, bothered by the cold winter weather, is kept warm by Poe's old coat from his time at West Point and from their pet black cat. She dies the next day, causing Poe great grief.

Sarah Helen Whitman is introduced at the end of the film, assisting an elderly couple. She meets Poe on her walk home through what seems to be a graveyard. Poe thinks she is Virginia Reincarnated and proceeds to follow her home. She rejects him when he makes advances, then Poe proceeds home where he starts hearing the tapping and recites “the raven”first seeing the shadow of a raven appear on his door. Hallucinating he begins climbing up a hill, and then resting on a rock that says wine, trying to move up past it he ends up perched on top of it before coming back to reality in his room. He goes to grab a drink and watches his wine glass turn to a skull, the horror causing him to drop it. 
A raven enters his room when he opens his window, answering all Poe’s questions with Nevermore.
His hallucinations show him with a ghost and then at heavens gate in front of an angel, as the gates close leaving Poe outside. Once returned to reality he finishes the poem before departing from his body. His death ending the film.

Cast

Production
Henry B. Walthall was granted the lead role as Edgar Allan Poe after previously playing the same author in D. W. Griffith's The Avenging Conscience in 1914. Because of the repeat role, he was dubbed "the image of Poe."

See also
Edgar Allan Poe in popular culture
Edgar Allan Poe in television and film
The Raven (1935 film)
The Raven (1963 film)
The Death of Poe (2006 DVD which includes The Raven as a special feature)

References

External links

1915 films
American silent feature films
American biographical films
1910s English-language films
American black-and-white films
Films directed by Charles Brabin
Films based on The Raven
Works about Edgar Allan Poe
Cultural depictions of Edgar Allan Poe
Films set in the 19th century
Essanay Studios films
1910s American films